Stanislav Igorevich Mareyev (born 25 June 1996) is a Russian football player.

Club career
He made his debut in the Russian Football National League for FC Irtysh Omsk on 1 August 2020 in a game against FC Yenisey Krasnoyarsk, as a starter.

References

External links
 
 Profile by Russian Football National League
 

1996 births
Sportspeople from Omsk
Living people
Russian footballers
Association football defenders
FC Zenit Saint Petersburg players
FC Irtysh Omsk players